This is a partial list of athletes who Youth Olympic and Olympic gold medalists, listing people who have won at least one Youth Olympics and Olympic gold medals.

 Names in Bold denote people that have competed in the most recent Youth Olympics, namely the 2020 Lausanne Winter Youth Olympics and the 2018 Buenos Aires Summer Youth Olympics or the most recent Olympics, namely the 2022 Beijing Winter Olympics and the 2020 Tokyo Summer Olympics.

Summer Games

Winter Games

 
Lists of Youth Olympic medalists